John Whitehead was a footballer who played in the Football League for Bootle, Everton and Liverpool.

References

English footballers
Bootle F.C. (1879) players
Everton F.C. players
Liverpool F.C. players
English Football League players
Year of death missing
Year of birth missing
Association football goalkeepers